London Conversations: The Best of Saint Etienne is a compilation album by the English electronic music group Saint Etienne. It was released as a deluxe 2CD/DVD set (packaged in a hardback book), standard 2-CD set and on double 12" vinyl. It features the 2008 Xenomania Mix of "Burnt Out Car", the Richard X mix of "This Is Tomorrow" and "Method of Modern Love". The compilation features a selection of their regular A-sides on the first disc, while disc two includes various further A-sides, B-sides, non-singles and album tracks.

Originally due for release in November 2008 following the re-release of "Burnt Out Car," the set was delayed several times as a result of manufacturing issues as well as the introductory single's low chart position. In addition, a planned single-disc edition (featuring only the first disc of the set) was cancelled. The set ultimately came out in February 2009 following the release of the newly recorded Richard X collaboration "Method of Modern Love." Some early-run copies of the 2CD edition are available, though, omitting "Method of Modern Love." The single-disc edition was eventually issued alongside remastered single-disc editions the rest of the band's catalogue in 2011, following the release of deluxe editions of most of their albums.

In its week of release the compilation charted at #79 in the UK, missing out on the Top 75 in part due to a surge in older albums following the Brit Awards.

Track listing

CD/DVD: Heavenly / HVNLP69CDSE

LP: Heavenly / HVNLP69

B-sides
from "Burnt Out Car"
 "River"
 "Night Vision"
 "Destroy The Building"
 "Burnt Out Car" (Mark Brown Remix Edit)
 "Burnt Out Car" (Mark Brown Remix)
 "Burnt Out Car" (Demo)

from "Method of Modern Love"
 "Method of Modern Love" (Radio Edit)
 "This Is Tomorrow" (Original Version)
 "Method of Modern Love" (Cola Boy Remix)
 "Method of Modern Love" (Richard X Join Our Clique Mix)
 "Method of Modern Love" (A cappella version)
 "Method of Modern Love" (Heartbreaks Remix)

Charts

References 

2009 greatest hits albums
Saint Etienne (band) compilation albums
Heavenly Recordings compilation albums